Kiraoli railway station (station code KLB) is a railway station located in Agra district in the Indian state of Uttar Pradesh.

Trains 
 Bayana–Agra MEMU Shuttle
 Agra Cantt–Bayana MEMU
 Avadh Express
 Yamuna Bridge–Bayana Passenger
 Haldighati Passenger
 Bayana–Yamuna Bridge Passenger 
 Agra Fort–Kota Passenger
 Kota–Agra–Yamuna Bridge Passenger

See also

 Northern Railway zone
 Kiraoli

References 

Railway stations in Agra district
Agra railway division